Specter at the Feast is the seventh studio album by American rock band Black Rebel Motorcycle Club, released on March 18, 2013 in Europe and March 19, 2013 in the US. It was released under the band's own record label, Abstract Dragon, through Vagrant Records. Unlike Beat The Devil's Tattoo, the album wasn't produced by Michael Been, who died after he suffered a heart attack mid-tour in 2010 while the band was playing at Pukkelpop. As a result, Specter at the Feast was a way for the band to mourn their loss and rid the pain, as he was the father of bassist Robert Levon Been, but also their live sound technician and a mentor to all the members.

The band's first single from the album, a cover of The Call's 1989 hit "Let the Day Begin", available as a free download on their official website. The same day, the song became Q'''s track of the day. The band have also released the "Let the Day Begin" EP for free, consisting of the single and the album track "Returning", which has also been made available for streaming on the official website.

The band have released a six-part promotional short film documenting the recording of Specter at the Feast''.

Track listing

Personnel
Peter Hayes - vocals, guitar, bass guitar, harmonica, keyboards
Robert Levon Been - vocals, guitar, bass guitar, piano
Leah Shapiro - drums, percussion, backing vocals

Charts

References

2013 albums
Black Rebel Motorcycle Club albums